Edward Allan Anderson (born 3 August 1908, date of death unknown) was a Belizean sports shooter. He competed in the 50 metre rifle, prone event at the 1968 Summer Olympics.

References

External links
 

1908 births
Year of death missing
Belizean male sport shooters
Commonwealth Games competitors for British Honduras
Shooters at the 1966 British Empire and Commonwealth Games
Olympic shooters of British Honduras
Shooters at the 1968 Summer Olympics
People from Corozal Town